The 689th Combat Communications Wing was a wing of the United States Air Force stationed at Robins Air Force Base, Georgia.  The wing was activated on 9October 2009 as a subordinate unit of Twenty-Fourth Air Force.  On 5June 2013, the wing was inactivated, along with the 3d Combat Communications Group at Tinker Air Force Base, Oklahoma.  The 5th Combat Communications Group at Robins now reports to the 688th Cyberspace Wing.

History
The 689th's mission was to train, deploy, and deliver expeditionary and specialized communications, air traffic control, and landing systems, and to take cyber capabilities to the tactical edge for relief and combat operations.

Its units included the 3d Combat Communications Group, at Tinker Air Force Base, Oklahoma, and the 5th Combat Communications Group at Robins Air Force Base in Georgia.

Lineage
 Designated as the 1931st Airways and Air Communications Service Squadron on 11 October 1948
 Organized on 18 October 1948
 Redesignated 1931st Communications Squadron on 1 July 1961
 Redesignated 1931st Communications Group on 1 March 1969
 Redesignated 1931st Information Systems Wing on 1 July 1984
 Redesignated 1931st Communications Wing on 1 November 1986
 Redesignated 1931st Communications Group on 1 October 1990
 Inactivated on 26 September 1991
 Redesignated 689th Combat Communications Wing on 22 September 2009
 Activated on 5 October 2009
 Inactivated on 30 September 2013

Assignments
 1804th Airways and Air Communications Service Group (later 1804th Airways and Air Communications Service Wing, Alaskan Airways and Air Communications Service Region, Alaskan Communications Region): 18 October 1948
 Air Force Communications Service (later Air Force Communications Command), 1 June 1972
 Continental Communications Division: 1 June 1981
 Air Force Communications Command: 1 May 1985
 21st Tactical Fighter Wing: 1 October 1990 – 26 September 1991
 Twenty-Fourth Air Force (Air Forces Strategic): 5 October 2009 – 30 September 2013

Components
 3d Combat Communications Group, 5 October 2009 – 30 September 2013
 5th Combat Communications Group, 5 October 2009 – 30 September 2013
 1825th Electronics Installation Squadron, 1 June 1972 – 30 June 1974
 1930th Information Systems Squadron (later 1930th Communications Squadron), 1 July 1985 – 1 October 1990
 1935th Communications Squadron, 1 June 1972 – 1 July 1972
 1995th Communications Squadron (later 1995th Information Systems Squadron, 1995th Communications Squadron), 1 June 1972 – 1 October 1990
 2064th Communications Squadron (later 2064th Information Systems Squadron, 2064th Communications Squadron), 1 June 1972 – 1 October 1990

Stations
 Elmendorf Air Force Base, Alaska, 18 October 1948 – 26 September 1991
 Robins Air Force Base, Georgia, 5 October 2009 – 30 September 2013

Awards

References

Bibliography
 
 

Wings of the United States Air Force
0689
Military units and formations established in 2009